The Merchants Exchange building (1842-1890) in Boston, Massachusetts was built in 1841 from a design by architect Isaiah Rogers. Centrally located on State Street, it functioned as a hub for business activities in the city.

History 

The Merchants Exchange served as one of Boston's "great gathering-points of the traders -- the marble-paved and frescoed hall ... with its newspaper files, bulletins, wind vane, and ship registry." It was "elegant ... with a fine reading-room, ... and besides accommodations for the post office, and for several insurance and brokers' offices, affords many conveniences for the mercantile community."

Architecture 

Built in 1841-1842 by architect Isaiah Rogers, Merchants Exchange was considered "among the best specimens of architecture in Boston" and "a dignified building in its day." Re-modelling occurred after the building "went down" in the fire of 1872.

After 1890, the "Exchange Building" occupied the site of the former Merchants Exchange building.

Function 

The building housed business activities, such as:
 Board of Trade (est. 1854)
 Boston Board of Marine Underwriters (est. 1850)
 Boston Marine Society
 Boston Stock Exchange (1844-1853)
 Commercial Exchange (est. 1871)
 Post-Office (ca.1860-1872)
 Soldiers' Messenger Corps

References

Images

Commercial buildings completed in 1842
Former buildings and structures in Boston
Greek Revival architecture in Massachusetts
Economic history of Boston
Financial District, Boston
19th century in Boston
1842 establishments in Massachusetts